Point Judith Pond is a shallow, four-mile (6 km)-long salt body of water lying behind the barrier beaches and sand dunes that form Point Judith Harbor, which lies immediately west of Point Judith in Narragansett, Rhode Island at the southwestern tip of Narragansett Bay. This waterway is used by a large fishing fleet and local and transient recreational craft. The harbor handles a large amount of passenger traffic, primarily during the summer. Year-round ferry service is available between Point Judith and Block Island.

Original work in Point Judith Harbor dates back to 1905. Work in the present project, completed in 1950 (except where noted), consists of:

This breakwater, constructed roughly in a "V" shape, and the two others mentioned below were built in 1914.
A -long stone breakwater extending southwesterly from Point Judith.
A -long stone breakwater extending southerly from the entrance to Point Judith Pond.
This most recent work was completed as a small project under Section 107 of the Continuing Authorities Program.
A -deep anchorage,  in area, located on the pond's westerly side, immediately inside the pond's entrance.
A six-foot-deep anchorage,  in area, at the end of the -long channel in Wakefield.
One shoal was removed from the -deep anchorage area, and the second from the east side of the Point Judith Pond entrance. This work was completed in 1921.

Various works to help trap and retain sand at the entrance to the pond.

References

External links

Rhode Island South Shore Sea Grant Project: Point Judith Pond

Lagoons of Washington County, Rhode Island
South Kingstown, Rhode Island
Narragansett, Rhode Island